The Karrick Building is a historic U.S. building located at 1490 Highland Avenue, Eau Gallie, Florida.  The building was constructed in 1924 by Jesse Karrick and it was used as a general merchandise and grocery store until 1963.  Jesse Karrick was the first proprietor of the store and also served as the first fire chief of Eau Gallie.

Notes

Gallery

Buildings and structures in Melbourne, Florida
Eau Gallie, Florida
Commercial buildings in Florida
Commercial buildings completed in 1924
1924 establishments in Florida